Willow Island is an unincorporated community in Pleasants County, West Virginia, United States. Willow Island had a post office, which opened on October 17, 1946, and closed on May 25, 1991. The Pleasants Power Station, site of the 1978 Willow Island disaster, is located in Willow Island. This is the location of Willow Island Baptist Church and Willow Island Cemetery, the burial site for many of the area's founding and prominent families. Willow Island was also the location of Cyanamid; later called Cytec Industries, a chemical plant and a large contributor to the Pleasants County school system and area's work force.

References

Unincorporated communities in Pleasants County, West Virginia
Unincorporated communities in West Virginia